Arthur Fitt (born 12 February 1928) is a former Australian rules footballer who played for the Fitzroy Football Club in the Victorian Football League (VFL).

Notes

External links 

Living people
1928 births
Australian rules footballers from Victoria (Australia)
Fitzroy Football Club players